Artists Space Gallery was an Australian art gallery showing mainly photography, as well as other media, through the 1980s in Melbourne.

Foundation

The gallery was founded in 1978 by Melbourne painter and photographer Wes Placek. He was joined in the early 80's by his partner Sophie Nowicka a textile designer and artist, who assisted in administration of the gallery and in curatorial selection of exhibitions.

Location 
When it opened, the gallery occupied the top floor of a 1920s shopfront in the main street at 127 Buckley St., near the railway station in the working-class suburb Essendon. In 1987 the Gallery was relocated, closer to Melbourne CBD and amongst a growing number of other galleries. Though it also showed other media, it was among contemporary specialist photography galleries The Photographers' Gallery, Brummels and Church Street that revived the medium as an art form. The new space, with four times the floor area, was in a former warehouse in North Fitzroy at 150 Park Street on the corner of Best Street, opposite a linear park created from the Inner Circle Railway Line which had closed in 1981.

Reception
A range of exhibitions included emerging artists and those well recognised nationally and internationally. While located in Essendon, in the opinion of The Age newspaper art reviewer Beatrice Faust, Placek's exhibitions "accumulated a lot of critical capital," as it "showed small collections of consistently good and sometimes excellent work," including Robert Mapplethorpe's 1983 photogravure suite 'Flowers', and also Bettina Rheims. However, in her 1987 review, just after the relocation, Faust feared the extra space would affect the quality of the work shown, though favourable reviews continued.

It signifies the impact of the Gallery, that founder Placek was himself included, among many of the past exhibitors at Artists Space, in the landmark survey show and publication of photography of the 1970s and 1980s, The Thousand Mile Stare.

Closure
Artists Space Gallery closed in 1990.

Exhibitions included
 1984: Ryszard Otręba, prints (the poster from this solo exhibition is in the collection of the National Gallery of Australia)
 1986, October 11–November 9: Sol Weiner
1986, November 17–December 14: Displaced Objects - Works by Chris Barry
 1987, to August 30: Lauren McIntyre
 1987, from Nov 4: "Just Wot”, an exhibition of visual poetry. Incl. Mimmo Cozzolino, Norma Pearce, Anthony Figallo, Julie Clarke-Powell
1987, to 31 December: Urban Structures, Janina Green, Lita Los Angeles, Bernice McPherson, Craig McGee, Wes Placek.
 1988, to 29 Feb: Michael Caddy, Di Clark, Ann Slater
 1988, 3–27 August: Wes Placek, Paintings
 1988, 7–25 September: Portraits by Paul Cox, Ben Lewin, Wolfgang Sievers
 1988, September: Double Exposure
 1988, to October 29: Peter Shaw, A Year of Bad Weather
 1988, to 22 October: Louis Geraldes and Graham Willoughby, Paintings
 1988, to 18 November: Anthony Figallo and Lloyd Jones; Images of La Mama, and Photographic Collages by Chris Barry 
 1988, to 18 December: Graduate Show, Victoria College
 1989, to April 7: Still Life, photography by Janina Green, Robert Mapplethorpe, Wes Placek, Bettina Rheims
 1989, to 29 July:  Wes Placek, Works from the kitchen
1989, 6—31 August: Grant Hobson, Transcending Toughness, and work by Paul Watkins
 1990, to 28 July: Kodak Five Visions, Bill McCann, Charles Radnay, Janina Green, Wes Placek
 1990, to August 25: Ian McIntosh ‘Affection’; Rick Wood ‘Fugue’
 1990, to November 30: Phillip Institute of Technology 1990 Photography Graduates
1990, to December 22, Paintings and sculptures by Wes Placek, Erika Vike, Sophie Nowicka, Graham Willoughby, Brian McNamara

References 

1978 establishments in Australia
1990 disestablishments in Australia
Art galleries established in 1978
Art galleries disestablished in 1990
Art museums and galleries in Melbourne
Photography in Australia
Photography museums and galleries in Australia